Elly Hutton (born 2 June 1976) is an Australian sprinter. She competed in the women's 4 × 100 metres relay at the 2000 Summer Olympics.

References

External links
 

1976 births
Living people
Athletes (track and field) at the 2000 Summer Olympics
Australian female sprinters
Olympic athletes of Australia
Place of birth missing (living people)
Olympic female sprinters